TV100 is a Hindi-language 24/7 news television channel, owned by Avanti Media Ltd. The channel is a free-to-air. The channel is available through cable platforms as well as online.

TV100 is a free to air channel and transmitting through Insert 4A at 83 degrees east in Mpeg 2 mode.

References

External links
www.tv100.info

Hindi-language television channels in India
Television channels and stations established in 2009
Hindi-language television stations
Television channels based in Noida